Russians in Kyrgyzstan form a minority ethnic group numbering 419,600 individuals according to the 2009 census, representing 9.1% of the total population. Most ethnic Russians migrated to the country during the 20th century. The Russian population has been declining since the 1991  breakup of the Soviet Union due to low fertility-rates and to emigration.  364,500 Russians and Ukrainians lived in Kyrgyzstan, representing 6.2% of its total population.

The ethnic Russian population lives primarily in the north, especially in the capital city of Bishkek, although some settlements in the north of the country have an ethnic Russian majority. Most ethnic Russians in Kyrgyzstan are either non-religious or Russian Orthodox, with a small proportion of Old Believers (an anti-reformist group that split from the Russian Orthodox church during the 17th century).

Notable people

Politics 

 Nikolai Tanayev, 8th Prime Minister of Kyrgyzstan
 Igor Chudinov
 Artem Novikov

Sports 

 Valentina Shevchenko
 Antonina Shevchenko
 Yevgeny Petrashov
 Igor Paklin

See also  
 Demographics of Kyrgyzstan

References 

Ethnic groups in Kyrgyzstan
Russian diaspora in Asia
Kyrgyzstan